The Tangenziale di Mestre (Mestre beltway), or Autostrada A57, was opened to traffic on 3 September 1972 in northern Italy.

Overview
The original design was to have a central dual carriageway as Autostrada A4 (motorway A4), and alongside a separated single carriageway to serve as a local beltway (similar to what was built around Bologna) but it had high costs for a motorway that was not expected to carry much through traffic. East of Venice, it could go only to Udine and Trieste, the latter was at that time the border with the Iron Curtain. The opposition of conservationist groups to a double dual carriageway running inside a city caused the plan to reduce to a single dual carriageway section instead, serving both as Autostrada A4 and local beltway.

Increased traffic
By the 1990s, it became evident that a road designed to cope with a 55,000-vehicle daily traffic level would not be able for  traffic levels of up to 150,000–170,000 vehicles (of which 30% were HGVs) by the early 2000s.

A first but temporary solution was to open a "third dynamic lane" on each carriageway: in the most trafficked hours, the emergency lane was suppressed, to be used as a lane for lorries and slow vehicles.

Passante di Mestre

A second definitive solution was to build the Passante di Mestre: opened on 8 February 2009, after about 4 years and a half of construction. It completely bypasses the Tangenziale di Mestre, finally separating Autostrada A4 from the local beltway.

Today, the "third dynamic lane" is still used, but daily traffic has greatly decreased. Speed limit is 90 km/h on faster lanes, 60 km/h on slower ones; a small part, near the interchange with Autostrada A27, has a 50 km/h to 60 km/h speed limit.

The old Tangenziale di Mestre has now to be called, more properly, Tangenziale di Venezia (with new highway identification code: A57): indeed, it is longer than the old Mestre one, because the Passante di Mestre bypasses all the area around Venice, beginning west just after Padua, going north almost to Treviso, and ending east near Quarto d'Altino. So that the old exits of Dolo and Mira, before part of Autostrada A4, are today part of the Tangenziale. Unfortunately, the signage has not been adapted to take account of this development confusing the poor motorist without local knowledge. For example, travelling east, a sign directs the motorist onto the A57 and that's the last time you will see any reference to A57. The signage quickly reverts to the out-of-date A4 or uses the European route signage.

The beltway is managed by Società delle Autostrade di Venezia e Padova and Autovie Venete S.p.A.

Route

See also
Autostrada A4
Autostrada A27
Venice

References

External links
A short history of the Tangenziale

1972 establishments in Italy
Ring roads in Italy
Autostrade in Italy
Transport in Veneto